Brandon Harris (born January 24, 1990) is an American football coach and former cornerback who is currently the cornerbacks coach at Florida Atlantic University. He was drafted by the Houston Texans in the second round of the 2011 NFL Draft. He has also played for the Tennessee Titans and the Toronto Argonauts of the Canadian Football League (CFL). He played college football at the University of Miami.

Early years
Harris attended Booker T. Washington High School. As a senior, he was the Florida Gatorade Player of the Year after he recorded 49 tackles, five sacks, four interceptions, and two touchdowns as a cornerback and 26 receptions for 501 yards and eight touchdowns as a wide receiver.

College career
As a freshman in 2008, Harris started six of 13 games for the Hurricanes at cornerback, recording 30 tackles, an interception, and a sack. As a sophomore in 2009 Harris recorded 55 tackles, two interceptions, and a sack. He was a first-team All-ACC selection, and earned second-team All-American honors from SI.com, and third-team from the Associated Press. As a Junior in 2010, he was a second-team All-ACC selection after starting all 13 games, recording 44 tackles and an interception. He finished his career with 32 starts in 39 games, 129 tackles and three interceptions.

After his junior season Harris announced that he would forgo his senior season and enter the 2011 NFL Draft.

Professional career

Houston Texans
Harris was taken with the 60th overall pick in the second round of the 2011 NFL Draft by the Houston Texans. Houston cut him on August 30, 2014, prior to the start of the 2014 season.

Tennessee Titans
The Tennessee Titans claimed Harris off waivers on August 31, 2014. He re-signed with the Titans on March 27, 2015.

Miami Dolphins
The Miami Dolphins signed Harris on July 31, 2016. On August 27, 2016, Harris was released by the Dolphins.

Toronto Argonauts
On May 11, 2017, Harris signed with the Toronto Argonauts of the Canadian Football League, and was a part of the Grey Cup winning team.

References

External links
Houston Texans bio
Miami Hurricanes bio

1990 births
Living people
Booker T. Washington Senior High School (Miami, Florida) alumni
Players of American football from Miami
American football cornerbacks
Miami Hurricanes football players
Houston Texans players
Tennessee Titans players
Miami Dolphins players
Toronto Argonauts players
FIU Panthers football coaches
Florida Atlantic Owls football coaches
Florida State Seminoles football coaches
Sports coaches from Miami
Players of Canadian football from Miami